Otto Mønsted Acthon (21 December 1917 – 13 August 1980) was a Danish equestrian. He competed in the 1948 and 1952 Summer Olympics.

References

1917 births
1980 deaths
Equestrians at the 1948 Summer Olympics
Equestrians at the 1952 Summer Olympics
Danish male equestrians
Olympic equestrians of Denmark
Sportspeople from Copenhagen